James Simonds (December 10, 1735 – February 20, 1831) was a merchant, judge and political figure in New Brunswick. He represented Sunbury County in the Nova Scotia House of Assembly from 1773 to 1782 and Saint John City and County in the Legislative Assembly of New Brunswick from 1796 to 1802.

He was born in Haverhill, Massachusetts, the son of Nathan Simonds and Sarah Hazen, and moved to the mouth of the Saint John River, then part of Nova Scotia, in 1762. With partners including William Hazen, Simonds began trading in fish, furs, lime and lumber products with Massachusetts. In 1767, he married Hannah Peabody. Simonds served as magistrate, probate judge, registrar of deeds and deputy customs collector for Sunbury County. The business encountered problems during the American Revolution and Simonds tried to sell his share of the business but his partners were not prepared to buy him out. In 1816, fourteen years after he retired from politics, he was named magistrate.

His sons Charles and Richard both served in the legislative assembly.

References

External links
Biography at the Dictionary of Canadian Biography Online

1735 births
1831 deaths
Members of the Legislative Assembly of New Brunswick
Nova Scotia pre-Confederation MLAs
Colony of New Brunswick judges